is an interchange passenger railway station in located in the city of Kawagoe, Saitama, Japan, operated by the private railway operator Tōbu Railway and East Japan Railway Company (JR East).

Lines

Station layout
The Tōbu and JR East stations are arranged side-by-side, with the Tōbu platforms on the east side and the JR East platforms on the west side. The elevated station building and concourse has exits on the east and west sides.

Tōbu Railway

Platforms
The station consists of two side platforms serving two tracks. This station has a season ticket sales office. Chest-high platform edge doors were installed in February 2018, and brought into use from March 2018.

JR East

The station has a "Midori no Madoguchi" staffed ticket office.

Platforms
The JR East station consists of two island platforms serving three tracks. The outer platforms, 3 and 6, are generally used for services to and from Ōmiya and the Saikyō Line, while the inner platforms, 4 and 5, serving the same track, are generally used for Kawagoe Line services westward to Komagawa and Hachiōji via the Hachikō Line.

Passenger statistics
In fiscal 2019, the station was used by an average of 124,534 passengers daily. and the JR East station was used by an average of 38,112 passengers daily (boarding passengers only). The passenger figures for previous years are as shown below. (JR East figures are for boarding passengers only.)

History

This was renamed Kawagoe Station on 22 July 1940 coinciding with the opening of the JNR (now JR East) station. The current elevated station building and concourse was opened in 1989. The west side of the station was enlarged in 2004 with the construction of additional sets of stairs to the JR platforms and a new Lumine building over the platforms. In 2007, the former "Fine" shopping and restaurant area within the Tobu side of the station was refurbished and reopened as "Equia Kawagoe". An additional "Equia" zone was opened above the Tobu ticket machine area in September 2008.

Through-running to and from  via the Tokyo Metro Fukutoshin Line commenced on 14 June 2008.

From 17 March 2012, station numbering was introduced on the Tobu Tojo Line, with Kawagoe Station becoming "TJ-21".

Chest-high platform edge doors were installed on the Tobu Tojo Line platforms in February 2018, and brought into use from 17 March 2018.

Surrounding area

 Hon-Kawagoe Station on the Seibu Shinjuku Line (approximately fifteen minutes' walk)
 Tobu Hotel
 

From November 2012, work commenced on remodelling the west side of the station, with redesigned segregated access and parking for private cars, buses, and taxis, and an elevated pedestrian walkway leading directly from the station building. The walkway and new upper-level west entrance opened on 26 March 2014.

Bus services
The following long-distance express bus services operate from the south side of the station.

 Narita Airport, operated jointly by Chiba Kōtsū, Kawagoe Motor Corp, and Tobu Bus West
 Haneda Airport, operated by Airport Transport Service (Limousine Bus) and Seibu Bus
 Tokyo Disney Resort, operated jointly by Tokyo Bay City Bus and Tobu Bus West
 Kyoto and Osaka, Wing Liner overnight service operated by Kintetsu Bus

See also
 List of railway stations in Japan

References

External links

 Kawagoe Station information (JR East) 
 Kawagoe Station information (Tobu) 

Railway stations in Kawagoe, Saitama
Stations of Tobu Railway
Stations of East Japan Railway Company
Tobu Tojo Main Line
Kawagoe Line
Railway stations in Japan opened in 1915